Sheryl Bailey (born May 20, 1966) is an American jazz guitarist and educator. She teaches guitar at the Berklee College of Music in Boston.

Biography
Bailey grew up in Pittsburgh, Pennsylvania, and started playing guitar at 13. At first she was primarily interested in rock music, but she discovered jazz after hearing guitarist Wes Montgomery on the radio. She attended Berklee College of Music in Boston, and after college she taught music at Towson State University in Baltimore. In 1998 she moved to New York City to pursue a career as a performer. She released her first album, Little Misunderstood, in 1995 with George Colligan, Vince Loving, and Chris Battistone. In 2001, Bailey she released Reunion of Souls with guitarist Chris Bergson, Ashley Turner, and Sunny Jain. Stewart Mason of Allmusic called one of the tracks "charming" and one "perfectly sweet" but said the album was "nothing groundbreaking". This was followed by The Power of 3 in 2002 which contained eight tracks all written by Bailey. Allmusic's Rick Anderson said that each track was "a gem" and "more complex than you'd guess at first listen".  He said the album was "highly recommended".  Her next album was 2004's Bull's Eye!.

In 2006, Bailey released Live @ The Fat Cat and was a headline act at the Pittsburgh Jazz Festival. Her sixth album, A New Promise, was released by MCG Jazz on February 2, 2010 and was a tribute to jazz guitarist Emily Remler.

In the August 10 edition of Down Beat, reviewer Phillip Booth called Bailey "one of the new greats of her chosen instrument". She has taught at Berklee, summer workshops at Stanford University, and the Collective School of Music in New York City.

Discography

As leader

Source:

References

External links

1966 births
American jazz guitarists
Bebop guitarists
Berklee College of Music alumni
Berklee College of Music faculty
Women jazz guitarists
American lesbian musicians
Living people
Musicians from Pittsburgh
Guitarists from Pennsylvania
20th-century American women guitarists
20th-century American guitarists
Jazz musicians from Pennsylvania
Women music educators
21st-century American women guitarists
21st-century American guitarists
American women academics
20th-century American LGBT people
21st-century American LGBT people